Showa-ike  is an earthfill dam located in Hyogo Prefecture in Japan. The dam is used for irrigation. The dam impounds about 1  ha of land when full and can store 62 thousand cubic meters of water.

See also
List of dams in Japan

References

Dams in Hyogo Prefecture

-dam-stub}}